Saccharicrinis aurantiacus is a Gram-negative and facultatively anaerobic bacterium from the genus Saccharicrinis which has been isolated from the sea squirt (Styela clava).

References

External links
Type strain of Labilibacter aurantiacus at BacDive -  the Bacterial Diversity Metadatabase

Bacteria described in 2017
Bacteroidia